Oleg Nikolayev may refer to:

 Oleg Nikolayev (footballer) (born 1998), Russian footballer 
 Oleg Nikolayev (boxer) (born 1968), Soviet boxer
 Oleg Nikolayev (politician) (born 1969), Russian statesman, politician, and economist